The Cook Islands is a self-governing island country in the South Pacific Ocean in free association with New Zealand.

Since 2001, the Cook Islands has run its own foreign and defence policy. In recent decades, the Cook Islands have adopted an increasingly assertive foreign policy, and a Cook Islander, Henry Puna, currently serves as Secretary General of the Pacific Islands Forum. Most Cook Islanders are citizens of New Zealand, but they also have the status of Cook Islands nationals, which is not given to other New Zealand citizens. The Cook Islands have been an active member of the Pacific Community since 1980.

The Cook Islands' main population centres are on the island of Rarotonga (10,898 in 2021), where there is an international airport. The census of 2021 put the total population at 15,040. There is also a larger population of Cook Islanders in New Zealand and Australia: in the 2018 New Zealand census, 80,532 people said they were Cook Islanders, or of Cook Islands descent. The last Australian census recorded 28,000 Cook Islanders living in Australia, many with Australian citizenship.

With over 168,000 visitors travelling to the islands in 2018, tourism is the country's main industry, and the leading element of the economy, ahead of offshore banking, pearls, and marine and fruit exports.

Etymology
The Cook Islands comprise 15 islands split between two island groups, which have carried individual names in indigenous languages including Cook Islands Māori and Pukapukan throughout the time they have been inhabited. The first name given by Europeans was Gente Hermosa (beautiful people) by Spanish explorers to Rakahanga in 1606.

The islands as a whole are named after British Captain James Cook, who visited during the 1770s and named Manuae "Hervey Island" after Augustus Hervey, 3rd Earl of Bristol. The southern island group became known as the "Hervey Islands" after this. In the 1820s, Russian Admiral Adam Johann von Krusenstern referred to the southern islands as the "Cook Islands" in his Atlas de l'Ocean Pacifique. The entire territory (including the northern island group) was not known as the "Cook Islands" until after its annexation by New Zealand in the early 20th century. In 1901, the New Zealand parliament passed the Cook and other Islands Government Act, demonstrating that the name "Cook Islands" only referred to some of the islands. However, this situation had changed by the passage of the Cook Islands Act 1915, which defined the Cooks' area and included all presently included islands.

The islands' official name in Cook Islands Māori is Kūki 'Āirani, a transliteration of the English name.

History

The Cook Islands were first settled around AD 1000 by Polynesian people who are thought to have migrated from Tahiti, an island  to the northeast of the main island of Rarotonga.

The first European contact with the islands took place in 1595 when the Spanish navigator Álvaro de Mendaña de Neira sighted the island of Pukapuka, which he named San Bernardo (Saint Bernard). Pedro Fernandes de Queirós, a Portuguese captain at the service of the Spanish Crown, made the first European landing in the islands when he set foot on Rakahanga in 1606, calling the island Gente Hermosa (Beautiful People).

The British navigator Captain James Cook arrived in 1773 and again in 1777 giving the island of Manuae the name Hervey Island. The Hervey Islands later came to be applied to the entire southern group. The name "Cook Islands", in honour of Cook, first appeared on a Russian naval chart published by Adam Johann von Krusenstern in the 1820s.

In 1813 John Williams, a missionary on the colonial brig Endeavour (not the same ship as Cook's) made the first recorded European sighting of Rarotonga. The first recorded landing on Rarotonga by Europeans was in 1814 by the Cumberland; trouble broke out between the sailors and the Islanders and many were killed on both sides. The islands saw no more Europeans until English missionaries arrived in 1821. Christianity quickly took hold in the culture and many islanders are Christians today.

The islands were a popular stop in the 19th century for whaling ships from the United States, Britain and Australia. They visited, from at least 1826, to obtain water, food, and firewood. Their favourite islands were Rarotonga, Aitutaki, Mangaia and Penrhyn.

The Cook Islands became aligned to the United Kingdom in 1890, largely because of the fear of British residents that France might occupy the islands as it already had Tahiti. On 6 September 1900, the islanders' leaders presented a petition asking that the islands (including Niue "if possible") should be annexed as British territory. On 8 and 9 October 1900, seven instruments of cession of Rarotonga and other islands were signed by their chiefs and people. A British Proclamation was issued, stating that the cessions were accepted and the islands declared parts of Her Britannic Majesty's dominions. However, it did not include Aitutaki. Even though the inhabitants regarded themselves as British subjects, the Crown's title was unclear until the island was formally annexed by that Proclamation. In 1901 the islands were included within the boundaries of the Colony of New Zealand by Order in Council under the Colonial Boundaries Act, 1895 of the United Kingdom. The boundary change became effective on 11 June 1901, and the Cook Islands have had a formal relationship with New Zealand since that time.

The Cook Islands responded to the call for service when World War I began, immediately sending five contingents, close to 500 men, to the war. The island's young men volunteered at the outbreak of the war to reinforce the Maori Contingents and the Australian and New Zealand Mounted Rifles. A Patriotic Fund was set up very quickly, raising funds to support the war effort. The Cook Islanders were trained at Narrow Neck Camp in Devonport, and the first recruits departed on 13 October 1915 on the SS Te Anau. The ship arrived in Egypt just as the New Zealand units were about to be transferred to the Western Front. In September, 1916, the Pioneer Battalion, a combination of Cook Islanders, Maori and Pakeha soldiers, saw heavy action in the Allied attack on Flers, the first battle of the Somme. Three Cook Islanders from this first contingent died from enemy action and at least ten died of disease as they struggled to adapt to the conditions in Europe. The 2nd and 3rd Cook Island Contingents were part of the Sinai-Palestine campaign, first in a logistical role for the Australian and New Zealand Mounted Rifles at their Moascar base and later in ammunition supply for the Royal Artillery. After the war, the men returned to the outbreak of the influenza epidemic in New Zealand, and this, along with European diseases meant that a large number did not survive and died in New Zealand or on their return home over the coming years.

When the British Nationality and New Zealand Citizenship Act 1948 came into effect on 1 January 1949, Cook Islanders who were British subjects automatically gained New Zealand citizenship. The islands remained a New Zealand dependent territory until the New Zealand Government decided to grant them self-governing status. On 4 August 1965, a constitution was promulgated. The first Monday in August is celebrated each year as Constitution Day. Albert Henry of the Cook Islands Party was elected as the first Premier and was knighted by Queen Elizabeth II. Henry led the nation until 1978, when he was accused of vote-rigging and resigned. He was stripped of his knighthood in 1979. He was succeeded by Tom Davis of the Democratic Party who held that position until March 1983.

On 13 July 2017, the Cook Islands established Marae Moana, making it become the world's largest protected area by size.

In March 2019, it was reported that the Cook Islands had plans to change its name and remove the reference to Captain James Cook in favour of "a title that reflects its 'Polynesian nature'". It was later reported in May 2019 that the proposed name change had been poorly received by the Cook Islands diaspora. As a compromise, it was decided that the English name of the islands would not be altered, but that a new Cook Islands Māori name would be adopted to replace the current name, a transliteration from English. Discussions over the name continued in 2020.

Geography

The Cook Islands are in the South Pacific Ocean, north-east of New Zealand, between American Samoa and French Polynesia.

The islands were formed by volcanic activity; the northern group is older and consists of six atolls, which are sunken volcanoes topped by coral growth. The climate is moderate to tropical. The Cook Islands consist of 15 islands and two reefs. From March to December, the Cook Islands are in the path of tropical cyclones, the most notable of which were the cyclones Martin and Percy. Two terrestrial ecoregions lie within the islands' territory: the Central Polynesian tropical moist forests and the Cook Islands tropical moist forests.

Note: The table is ordered from north to south. Population figures from the 2016 census.

Gallery

Politics and foreign relations

The Cook Islands are a representative democracy with a parliamentary system in an associated state relationship with New Zealand. Executive power is exercised by the government, with the Prime Minister as head of government. Legislative power is vested in both the government and the Parliament of the Cook Islands. While the country is de jure unicameral, there are two legislative bodies with the House of Ariki acting as a de facto upper house.

There is a multi-party system. The Judiciary is independent of the executive and the legislature.

The islands are self-governing in "free association" with New Zealand. Under the Cook Islands constitution, New Zealand cannot pass laws for the Cook Islands. Rarotonga has its own foreign service and diplomatic network. Cook Islands nationals have the right to become citizens of New Zealand and can receive New Zealand government services when in New Zealand, but the reverse is not true; New Zealand citizens are not Cook Islands nationals. Despite this, the Cook Islands had diplomatic relations in its own name with 52 other countries. The Cook Islands is not a United Nations member state, but, along with Niue, has had their "full treaty-making capacity" recognised by the United Nations Secretariat, and is a full member of the World Health Organization (WHO), UNESCO, the International Civil Aviation Organization, the International Maritime Organization and the UN Food and Agriculture Organization, all UN specialized agencies, and is an associate member of the United Nations Economic and Social Commission for Asia and the Pacific (UNESCAP) and a Member of the Assembly of States of the International Criminal Court.

On 11 June 1980, the United States signed a treaty with the Cook Islands specifying the maritime border between the Cook Islands and American Samoa and also relinquishing any American claims to Penrhyn, Pukapuka, Manihiki, and Rakahanga. In 1990 the Cook Islands and France signed a treaty that delimited the boundary between the Cook Islands and French Polynesia. In late August 2012, United States Secretary of State Hillary Clinton visited the islands. In 2017, the Cook Islands signed the UN Treaty on the Prohibition of Nuclear Weapons.

Defence and police

Defence is the responsibility of New Zealand, in consultation with the Cook Islands and at its request.

The Cook Islands Police Service is the police force of the Cook Islands.

Human rights

Male homosexuality is de jure illegal in the Cook Islands and is punishable by a maximum term of seven years imprisonment; however, the law is not enforced, and legislation to change it is pending.

Administrative subdivisions
There are island councils on all of the inhabited outer islands (Outer Islands Local Government Act 1987 with amendments up to 2004, and Palmerston Island Local Government Act 1993) except Nassau, which is governed by Pukapuka (Suwarrow, with only one caretaker living on the island, also governed by Pukapuka, is not counted with the inhabited islands in this context). Each council is headed by a mayor.

The three Vaka councils of Rarotonga established in 1997 (Rarotonga Local Government Act 1997), also headed by mayors, were abolished in February 2008, despite much controversy.

On the lowest level, there are village committees. Nassau, which is governed by Pukapuka, has an island committee (Nassau Island Committee), which advises the Pukapuka Island Council on matters concerning its own island.

Demographics

Births and deaths

Religion 

In the Cook Islands the Church is separate from the state, and most of the population is Christian. The religious distribution is as follows:

The various Protestant groups account for 62.8% of the believers, the most followed denomination being the Cook Islands Christian Church with 49.1%. Other Protestant Christian groups include Seventh-day Adventist 7.9%, Assemblies of God 3.7% and Apostolic Church 2.1%. The main non-Protestant group is Roman Catholics with 17% of the population. The Church of Jesus Christ of Latter-day Saints makes up 4.4%.

Economy

The economy is strongly affected by geography. It is isolated from foreign markets, and has some inadequate infrastructure; it lacks major natural resources, has limited manufacturing and suffers moderately from natural disasters. Tourism provides the economic base that makes up approximately 67.5% of GDP. Additionally, the economy is supported by foreign aid, largely from New Zealand. China has also contributed foreign aid, which has resulted in, among other projects, the Police Headquarters building. The Cook Islands is expanding its agriculture, mining and fishing sectors, with varying success.

Since approximately 1989, the Cook Islands have become a location specialising in so-called asset protection trusts, by which investors shelter assets from the reach of creditors and legal authorities. According to The New York Times, the Cooks have "laws devised to protect foreigners' assets from legal claims in their home countries", which were apparently crafted specifically to thwart the long arm of American justice; creditors must travel to the Cook Islands and argue their cases under Cooks law, often at prohibitive expense. Unlike other foreign jurisdictions such as the British Virgin Islands, the Cayman Islands and Switzerland, the Cooks "generally disregard foreign court orders" and do not require that bank accounts, real estate, or other assets protected from scrutiny (it is illegal to disclose names or any information about Cooks trusts) be physically located within the archipelago. Taxes on trusts and trust employees account for some 8% of the Cook Islands economy, behind tourism but ahead of fishing.

In recent years, the Cook Islands has gained a reputation as a debtor paradise, through the enactment of legislation that permits debtors to shield their property from the claims of creditors.

Since 2008 the Executive Director of Cook Islands Bank has been Vaine Nooana-Arioka.

Infrastructure

There are eleven airports in the Cook Islands, including one with a paved runway, Rarotonga International Airport, served by four passenger airlines.

Culture

Newspapers 
Newspapers in the Cook Islands are usually published in English with some articles in Cook Islands Māori. The Cook Islands News has been published since 1945, although it was owned by the government until 1989. Former newspapers include Te Akatauira, which was published from 1978 to 1980.

Language
The languages of the Cook Islands include English, Cook Islands Māori (or "Rarotongan"), and Pukapukan. Dialects of Cook Islands Maori include Penrhyn; Rakahanga-Manihiki; the Ngaputoru dialect of Atiu, Mitiaro, and Mauke; the Aitutaki dialect; and the Mangaian dialect. Cook Islands Maori and its dialectic variants are closely related to both Tahitian and to New Zealand Māori. Pukapukan is considered closely related to the Samoan language. English and Cook Islands Māori are official languages of the Cook Islands; per the Te Reo Maori Act. The legal definition of Cook Islands Māori includes Pukapukan.

Music

Music in the Cook Islands is varied, with Christian songs being quite popular, but traditional dancing and songs in Polynesian languages remain popular.

Public holidays

Art

Carving

Woodcarving is a common art form in the Cook Islands. The proximity of islands in the southern group helped produce a homogeneous style of carving but that had special developments in each island. Rarotonga is known for its fisherman's gods and staff-gods, Atiu for its wooden seats, Mitiaro, Mauke and Atiu for mace and slab gods and Mangaia for its ceremonial adzes. Most of the original wood carvings were either spirited away by early European collectors or were burned in large numbers by missionaries. Today, carving is no longer the major art form with the same spiritual and cultural emphasis given to it by the Maori in New Zealand. However, there are continual efforts to interest young people in their heritage and some good work is being turned out under the guidance of older carvers. Atiu, in particular, has a strong tradition of crafts both in carving and local fibre arts such as tapa. Mangaia is the source of many fine adzes carved in a distinctive, idiosyncratic style with the so-called double-k design. Mangaia also produces food pounders carved from the heavy calcite found in its extensive limestone caves.

Weaving
The outer islands produce traditional weaving of mats, basketware and hats. Particularly fine examples of rito hats are worn by women to church. They are made from the uncurled immature fibre of the coconut palm and are of very high quality. The Polynesian equivalent of Panama hats, they are highly valued and are keenly sought by Polynesian visitors from Tahiti. Often, they are decorated with hatbands made of minuscule pupu shells that are painted and stitched on by hand. Although pupu are found on other islands the collection and use of them in decorative work has become a speciality of Mangaia. The weaving of rito is a speciality of the northern islands, Manihiki, Rakahanga and Penrhyn.

Tivaevae
A major art form in the Cook Islands is tivaevae. This is, in essence, the art of handmade Island scenery patchwork quilts. Introduced by the wives of missionaries in the 19th century, the craft grew into a communal activity, which is probably one of the main reasons for its popularity.

Contemporary art
The Cook Islands has produced internationally recognised contemporary artists, especially in the main island of Rarotonga. Artists include painter (and photographer) Mahiriki Tangaroa, sculptors Eruera (Ted) Nia (originally a film maker) and master carver Mike Tavioni, painter (and Polynesian tattoo enthusiast) Upoko'ina Ian George, Aitutakian-born painter Tim Manavaroa Buchanan, Loretta Reynolds, Judith Kunzlé, Joan Rolls Gragg, Kay George (who is also known for her fabric designs), Apii Rongo, Varu Samuel, and multi-media, installation and community-project artist Ani O'Neill, all of whom currently live on the main island of Rarotonga. Atiuan-based Andrea Eimke is an artist who works in the medium of tapa and other textiles, and also co-authored the book 'Tivaivai – The Social Fabric of the Cook Islands' with British academic Susanne Kuechler. Many of these artists have studied at university art schools in New Zealand and continue to enjoy close links with the New Zealand art scene.

New Zealand-based Cook Islander artists include Michel Tuffery, print-maker David Teata, Richard Shortland Cooper, Sylvia Marsters and Jim Vivieaere.

On Rarotonga, the main commercial galleries are Beachcomber Contemporary Art (Taputapuatea, Avarua) run by Ben & Trevon Bergman, and The Art Studio Gallery (Arorangi) run by Ian and Kay George. The Cook Islands National Museum also exhibits art.

Wildlife

 The national flower of the Cook Islands is the Tiare māori or Tiale māoli (Penrhyn, Nassau, Pukapuka).
 The Cook Islands have a large non-native population of Ship rat and Kiore toka (Polynesian rat). The rats have dramatically reduced the bird population on the islands.
 In April 2007, 27 Kuhl's lorikeet were re-introduced to Atiu from Rimatara. Fossil and oral traditions indicate that the species was formerly on at least five islands of the southern group. Excessive exploitation for its red feathers is the most likely reason for the species's extinction in the Cook Islands.
The Islands’ surrounding waters are the home of the Peppermint angelfish. While they are common, due to the difficulty of harvesting them they are one of the most expensive marine aquarium fish with a price of US$30,000.

Sport

Rugby league is the most popular sport in the Cook Islands.

See also

 Demographics of the Cook Islands
 Index of Cook Islands–related articles
 List of Cook Islanders
 List of islands
 Outline of the Cook Islands

References

Notes

Further reading
 Gilson, Richard. The Cook Islands 1820–1950. Wellington, New Zealand: Victoria University Press, 1980. 
 Roberts, John.  Around the Corner from Nowhere: The Cook Islands Rediscovered. Independent Publishing Network, 2022, Amazon.

External links
  Cook Islands Government
 Cook Islands News – daily newspaper
 Chief of State and Cabinet Members
 Cook Islands. The World Factbook. Central Intelligence Agency.
 Independent Guide to all 15 islands 
 Cook Islands from UCB Libraries GovPubs
 

 
1965 establishments in Oceania
Associated states of New Zealand
British Western Pacific Territories
Countries in Polynesia
English-speaking countries and territories
Island countries
New Zealand–Pacific relations
Small Island Developing States
States and territories established in 1965
Countries in Oceania